The 2000 Holy Cross Crusaders football team was an American football team that represented the College of the Holy Cross during the 2000 NCAA Division I-AA football season. Holy Cross finished second in the Patriot League. 

In their fifth year under head coach Dan Allen, the Crusaders compiled a 7–4 record. David Puloka and Patrick Quay were the team captains.

The Crusaders outscored opponents 245 to 223. Their 4–2 conference record placed second in the seven-team Patriot League standings. 

Holy Cross played its home games at Fitton Field on the college campus in Worcester, Massachusetts.

Schedule

References

Holy Cross
Holy Cross Crusaders football seasons
Holy Cross Crusaders football